The  was an army of the Imperial Japanese Army recruited from, and stationed on, the island of Taiwan as a garrison force.

History
Following the First Sino-Japanese War, the Treaty of Shimonoseki transferred control of Taiwan from Qing dynasty China to the Empire of Japan. The Japanese government established the Governor-General of Taiwan based in Taipei. The Governor-General of Taiwan was given control of local military forces on 20 August 1919, which formed the nucleus of the Taiwan Army of Japan.

Primarily a garrison force, the Japanese Taiwan Army was placed under control of the Shanghai Expeditionary Army at the start of the Second Sino-Japanese War in 1937. A component of the Taiwan Army, the Taiwan Independent Combined Brigade, was active in numerous campaigns on the Chinese mainland, and was later expanded into the 48th Infantry Division. Troops from this army were also involved in the Nanjing Massacre.

Towards the end of World War II, as the situation looked increasingly desperate for Japan, the Taiwan Army was merged with several other units garrisoning the island of Taiwan against possible Allied invasion, and the Taiwan Army was absorbed into the new Japanese Tenth Area Army on 22 September 1944, under which it formed the Taiwan District Army on 1 February 1945, but its command was directly by the Japanese 10th Area Army.

List of commanders

Commanding officers

Chief of staff

See also
Armies of the Imperial Japanese Army
Ethnic Taiwanese Imperial Japan Serviceman
Japanese Korean Army
Takasago Volunteers

References

External links

Japanese armies
Taiwan under Japanese rule
Military units and formations established in 1919
Military units and formations disestablished in 1944
Japan–Taiwan military relations
Military history of Taiwan